Bright is an unincorporated community and census-designated place (CDP) in Dearborn County, Indiana, United States. The population was 5,814 at the 2020 census.

History
A post office was established at Bright in 1847, and remained in operation until it was discontinued in 1904.

At least since the 1980s, Bright has been transformed from a small town to an exurb of Cincinnati.

Geography
Bright is located in northeastern Dearborn County at  (39.218114, -84.862357), in Logan, Harrison, and Miller townships. The eastern edge of the Bright CDP follows the Indiana–Ohio border.

Demographics

As of the census of 2000, there were 5,405 people, 1,770 households, and 1,493 families residing in the CDP. The racial makeup of the CDP was 98.43% White, 0.41% African American, 0.11% Native American, 0.09% Asian, 0.30% from other races, and 0.67% from two or more races. Hispanic or Latino of any race were 0.63% of the population.

There were 1,770 households, out of which 46.8% had children under the age of 18 living with them, 73.4% were married couples living together, 8.3% had a female householder with no husband present, and 15.6% were non-families. 12.8% of all households were made up of individuals, and 3.7% had someone living alone who was 65 years of age or older. The average household size was 3.05 and the average family size was 3.36.

In the CDP, the population was spread out, with 31.7% under the age of 18, 7.9% from 18 to 24, 31.6% from 25 to 44, 22.1% from 45 to 64, and 6.7% who were 65 years of age or older. The median age was 34 years. For every 100 females, there were 100.6 males. For every 100 females age 18 and over, there were 98.4 males.

The median income for a household in the CDP was $63,813, and the median income for a family was $66,639. Males had a median income of $41,923 versus $27,917 for females. The per capita income for the CDP was $22,401. About 1.6% of families and 1.7% of the population were below the poverty line, including 1.8% of those under age 18 and 2.6% of those age 65 or over.

References

Census-designated places in Dearborn County, Indiana
Census-designated places in Indiana